Gaberl Pass (el. 1551 m.) is a high mountain pass in the Austrian Alps in the Bundesland of Styria.

A steep road connects Köflach with the upper Mur River valley, running next to the Stubalpe. This road dates from Roman times.

It is a popular destination for both summer and winter sports.

On a clear day, the views are wide to the Dachstein in the northwest, the Riegersburg in the south and east, and into Hungary and Slovenia.

See also
 List of highest paved roads in Europe
 List of mountain passes

Mountain passes of the Alps
Mountain passes of Styria